The Socialist Academy of Social Sciences (SAON) was an educational establishment created in Russia in October 1918 with “the aim of studying and teaching social studies from the point of view of scientific socialism.” The original name of the academy was agreed over and against the proposal to call it the Communist Academy owing to objections raised by Left Socialist Revolutionaries. They had supported the Bolshevik seizure of power in November 1917, but had withdrawn that support in March 1918. Nevertheless they continued their involvement in such institutions as the Socialist Academy at this time.

On 17 April 1924, the Academy was transformed into the Communist Academy.

Bulletin of the Socialist Academy
From 1922, the Academy published a bulletin Вестник Социалистической академии (Bulletin of the Socialist Academy). After 6 issues, the numbering was continued under the title Вестник Коммунистической академии" (Bulletin of the Communist Academy).
 No.1, November 1922
 No.2, January 1923
 No.3, February 1923
 No.4, April-July 1923
 No.5, August-September 1923
 No.6, October-December 1923

References

1918 establishments in Russia
Socialism in Russia
Universities and institutes established in the Soviet Union